The A627(M) is a motorway that runs between Chadderton and Rochdale in Greater Manchester, England. It opened in 1972.

Route
Heading north, the road starts as a two-lane dual carriageway on the A663 at Chadderton. It turns sharply left and passes west of Royton. It continues to its next junction, where it has a  spur. Although signed as the A627(M), a map exists showing it as the A6138(M). After this junction it gains a third lane, before reaching a roundabout at the M62 junction 20. This junction has been designed to accommodate a future flyover. After crossing the roundabout, the route continues as a dual two-lane route for another  before turning sharp right to reach its terminal crossroads.

Junctions

See also
 List of motorways in the United Kingdom

References

External links

 Lancashire County Council – Historic Highways – A627(M)
 Pathetic Motorways – A627(M)
 The Motorway Archive – A627(M)

Motorways in England
Roads in Greater Manchester
Chadderton